Talmont-Saint-Hilaire is a commune in the Vendée department in the Pays de la Loire region in western France. The commune was formed by the merger of the former communes of Talmont and Saint-Hilaire-de-Talmont in 1974.

Richard I of England often had his base in Talmont, and owned the Château de Talmont from 1182 until his death.

Population

See also
Communes of the Vendée department

References

Communes of Vendée
Populated coastal places in France